Jannika Wirtanen (née Bergroth) (born 28 February 1985) better known as Jannika B is a Finnish singer and songwriter. Her professional music career began when she took part in the music competition Idols in 2007 and 2008, followed by the Finnish X Factor in 2009.

After a few appearances on Finland's Swedish-language station Yle Radio Vega, she debuted her Finnish-language single "Kuin kynsi lakattu" in 2009. Her first studio album was released in 2013 titled Kaikki rohkeus. In February 2012, she had founded her own independent record label Ona with distribution agreements with Sony Music. 

Jannika B participated in Tanssii tähtien kanssa, the Finnish version of Strictly Come Dancing on MTV3 during the autumn season of 2019, and reached second place in a field of 10 participating Finnish celebrities.

Discography

Albums

Singles

References

External links
Official website

21st-century Finnish women singers
1985 births
Living people